In Chang-soo (born 23 November 1972) is a former South Korean footballer and coach. He holds Argentine citizenship.

In was born in South Korea. When he was a child, he emigrated to Argentina. His Argentine name is Diego.

Club career 
In Chang-soo played for E-Land Puma during 1994 and 1995.

Managerial career 
In 2006, he started his coaching career in Ansan Hallelujah.

On 5 December 2017, he was appointed as manager of Seoul E-Land.

In 2019, In was appointed as assistant manager of South Korea under-20 team. With them, he was the runner-up at the 2019 FIFA U-20 World Cup.

References 

1972 births
Living people
South Korean footballers
Argentine footballers
South Korean football managers
South Korean emigrants to Argentina
Association football defenders
Seoul E-Land FC managers
Pocheon Citizen FC players